Charles T. Tatham (September 3, 1854 – September 24, 1939) was an American fencer who competed in the 1904 Summer Olympics. He was born and died in New York City and worked for his father's lead manufacturing company in Philadelphia. In 1891, Tatham was one of the founders of the AFLA/USFA.

Tatham won both the National Individual Epee title and the National Individual Foil title in 1901 and repeated as the individual epee champion in 1902 and 1903. He was a member of the National Team Epee title winners in 1908.

At the 1904 Summer Olympics in St. Louis, Tatham won silver medals in the individual épée and team foil competition, and a bronze medal in the individual foil competition. Although born in the United States, the official 1904 Olympic Report indicated that Tatham represented Cuba. While the vast majority of Olympic athletes at the 1904 games were from the United States (over 80%), many were listed as representing a country of their ancestry.

References

External links
 profile

1854 births
1939 deaths
American male épée fencers
Fencers at the 1904 Summer Olympics
Olympic silver medalists for the United States in fencing
Olympic bronze medalists for the United States in fencing
Medalists at the 1904 Summer Olympics
American male foil fencers
Olympic fencers of Cuba
19th-century American people
20th-century American people